Minneola is a city in Clark County, Kansas, United States.  As of the 2020 census, the population of the city was 738.

History
Minneola was founded in 1887. Its name is a combination of that of Minnie Davis and Ola Watson, the wives of pioneer settlers.  A post office first established in 1885 in Appleton (an extinct town) was moved to Minneola in 1888.

Geography
Minneola is located at  (37.441260, -100.014406). The city is roughly five blocks by eight blocks in size; everything is within walking or biking distance.

Climate
According to the Köppen Climate Classification system, Minneola has a semi-arid climate, abbreviated "BSk" on climate maps.

Demographics

2010 census
As of the census of 2010, there were 745 people, 289 households, and 194 families residing in the city. The racial makeup of the city was 95.6% White, 0.5% Native American, 1.2% Asian, 0.1% Pacific Islander, 0.4% from other races, and 2.1% from two or more races. Hispanic or Latino of any race were 4.2% of the population.

There were 289 households, of which 32.2% had children under the age of 18 living with them, 53.3% were married couples living together, 9.7% had a female householder with no husband present, 4.2% had a male householder with no wife present, and 32.9% were non-families. 30.1% of all households were made up of individuals, and 18% had someone living alone who was 65 years of age or older. The average household size was 2.45 and the average family size was 3.03.

The median age in the city was 42.9 years. 26.4% of residents were under the age of 18; 7.2% were between the ages of 18 and 24; 19.1% were from 25 to 44; 24% were from 45 to 64; and 23.2% were 65 years of age or older. The gender makeup of the city was 45.0% male and 55.0% female.

2000 census
As of the census of 2000, there were 717 people, 283 households, and 196 families residing in the city. The racial makeup of the city was 98.47% White, 0.28% African American, 0.42% Native American, 0.14% Asian, 0.28% from other races, and 0.42% from two or more races. Hispanic or Latino of any race were 1.39% of the population.

There were 283 households, out of which 31.1% had children under the age of 18 living with them, 60.8% were married couples living together, 6.7% had a female householder with no husband present, and 30.7% were non-families. 30.0% of all households were made up of individuals, and 18.4% had someone living alone who was 65 years of age or older. The average household size was 2.44 and the average family size was 3.04.

In the city, the population was spread out, with 26.8% under the age of 18, 5.0% from 18 to 24, 23.4% from 25 to 44, 20.9% from 45 to 64, and 23.8% who were 65 years of age or older. The median age was 42 years. For every 100 females, there were 92.7 males. For every 100 females age 18 and over, there were 79.2 males.

The median income for a household in the city was $32,019, and the median income for a family was $41,750. Males had a median income of $28,250 versus $22,500 for females. The per capita income for the city was $16,498. About 14.4% of families and 11.7% of the population were below the poverty line, including 10.6% of those under age 18 and 18.9% of those age 65 or over.

Religion
Minneola has four churches: CrossWalk Christian Church (formerly First Christian Church of Minneola), Minneola United Methodist Church, Minneola Community Church and Minneola Reformed Presbyterian Church. The four churches partner together through the Minneola Ministry Alliance to coordinate the serving of the local community.

Economy
Originally eclipsing the nearby Appleton  settlement because of its proximity to the Rock Island Rail line, Minneola now benefits from being at the intersection of U.S. Routes 54 and 283.  The Minneola Co-op's grain elevator stands sentinel at the north edge of town along the rail line and is visible for miles around.  Most businesses are focused on agricultural needs in this farming and ranching community.  The Minneola Record, founded in 1906, is believed to have been the oldest continuously operating business in the town.

Education

Schools
USD 219 Minneola Schools draws students from town as well as the surrounding area.  Minneola High School moved into a new building in 2006, complete with updated science labs and computer classes.  A few classes at the high school can be taken for college credit.  Sports, band, and choir are offered. The school has about 80 students and 10 teachers. The school mascot is a Wildcat, and the school colors are purple and gold. 
The Minneola Wildcats won the Kansas State High School 8-Man football championship in 1980.

The grade school offers all students the small size and individual attention. The end of the school year in mid-to-late May is frequently celebrated with a parade through downtown. The event, known as Community Day, has been in existence for several decades.

Library
Minneola possesses a modern library, which circulates approximately 14,000 books and offers computer access to patrons.

Infrastructure
The Minneola District Hospital is located in the city.

A volunteer fire department and the Clark County Sheriff's Department oversee public safety. In 2017 the city established a police department.

Centennial Park features a stone shelter built in the 1940s by local farmers using local rock; it was renovated around the time of the town's 100th birthday in 1987, when a war memorial was installed.  After being closed for several years, the 1969-era town swimming pool has been completely renovated and offers swimming lessons during the warm months.  The civic center hosts regular meetings and is available for meetings and parties; its kitchen cooks for 130 seniors in the region each weekday.

Notable people
 Eric Melgren, United States federal judge.

References

Further reading

External links

 City of Minneola
 Minneola - Directory of Public Officials
 USD 219, local school district
 Minneola City Map, KDOT

Cities in Clark County, Kansas
Cities in Kansas